The 1920 Mississippi College Collegians football team was an American football team that represented Mississippi College as a member of the Southern Intercollegiate Athletic Association (SIAA) during the 1920 college football season. In their first year under head coach Stanley L. Robinson, the team compiled a 3–5 record.

Schedule

References

Mississippi College
Mississippi College Choctaws football seasons
Mississippi College Choctaws football